Cytochrome c oxidase copper chaperone is a protein that in humans is encoded by the COX17 gene.

Function 

Cytochrome c oxidase (COX), the terminal component of the mitochondrial respiratory chain, catalyzes the electron transfer from reduced cytochrome c to oxygen. This component is a heteromeric complex consisting of 3 catalytic subunits encoded by mitochondrial genes and multiple structural subunits encoded by nuclear genes. The mitochondrially-encoded subunits function in electron transfer, and the nuclear-encoded subunits may function in the regulation and assembly of the complex. This nuclear gene encodes a protein which is not a structural subunit, but may be involved in the recruitment of copper to mitochondria for incorporation into the COX apoenzyme. This protein shares 92% amino acid sequence identity with mouse and rat Cox17 proteins. This gene is no longer considered to be a candidate gene for COX deficiency. A pseudogene COX17P has been found on chromosome 13.

References

Further reading

External links